Elections to Bolton Metropolitan Borough Council were held on 10 June 2004.  The whole council was up for election with boundary changes since the last election in 2003. The council stayed under no overall control, with the Liberal Democrats overtaking the Labour Party, by 1 seat, as the largest party and assuming control of the council from Labour.  Overall turnout was 43.5%.

Election result

Council Composition
Prior to the election the composition of the council was:

After the election the composition of the council was:

Ward results

Astley Bridge ward

Bradshaw ward

Breightmet ward

Bromley Cross ward

Crompton ward

Farnworth ward

Great Lever ward

Halliwell ward

Harper Green ward

Heaton and Lostock ward

Horwich and Blackrod ward

Horwich North East ward

Hulton ward

Kearsley ward

Little Lever and Darcy Lever ward

Rumworth ward

Smithills ward

Tonge with The Haulgh ward

Westhoughton North and Chew Moor ward

Westhoughton South ward

Sources

Notes

References
 

2004
2004 English local elections
2000s in Greater Manchester